Zirnay-e Sofla (also Romanized as Zīrnāy-e ‘Soflá; also known as Zīrnā-e Soflá) is a village in Doshman Ziari Rural District, in the Central District of Kohgiluyeh County, Kohgiluyeh and Boyer-Ahmad Province, Iran. At the 2006 census, its population was 79, in 12 families.

References 

Populated places in Kohgiluyeh County